The Taiwanese records in swimming are the fastest ever performances of swimmers from Republic of China (Taiwan, ROC), competing as Chinese Taipei, which are recognised and ratified by the Chinese Taipei Swimming Association.

Records are recognized for males and females in the following long course (50m) and short course (25m) events:
freestyle: 50, 100, 200, 400, 800 and 1500;
backstroke: 50, 100 and 200;
breaststroke: 50, 100 and 200;
butterfly: 50, 100 and 200;
individual medley (I.M.): 100 (25m only), 200 and 400;
relays: 4x50 free (25m only), 4x100 free, 4x200 free, 4x50 medley, and 4 × 100 medley.

All records were set in finals unless noted otherwise.

Long Course (50 m)

Men

Women

Mixed relay

Short Course (25 m)

Men

Women

Mixed relay

References

External links
 Chinese Taipei Swimming Association web site

Taipei
Records
Swimming
Swimming